Christ Church Cathedral School is an independent preparatory school for boys in Oxford, England. It is one of three choral foundation schools in the city and educates choristers of Christ Church Cathedral, and the Chapels of Worcester College and Pembroke College. It is a member of the IAPS and the Choir Schools Association.

History
Now a Church of England School, it was originally housed within the College itself.  Today its premises are located across from Christ Church at 3 Brewer Street and Cardinal Wolsey's house is still used for teaching.

In the 19th century, the Dean of Christ Church, Henry Liddell (father of Alice, who was immortalised in the books of Lewis Carroll) arranged for the building of a new choir school on its present site.

In 1938, Wilfrid Oldaker took over as headmaster, finding a school with only nineteen boarders, and set out to enlarge it, roughly trebling the school's size in five years. He was resisted in this by the Dean and Chapter, who did not want a larger prep school on their hands. Oldaker made other big changes, such as joining the IAPS, which meant preparing all boys for Common Entrance, appointing prefects, dividing the school into houses called Wolsey, Sayers, and Carroll, and introducing the teaching of Greek. In 1939, he launched a school magazine called The Cardinal's Hat. In 1945, Oldaker moved on to King's School, Canterbury, with Oxford seeing the move as being caused by the Dean and Chapter giving him little support in his development plans.

More recent developments include the opening of a Pre-Prep department and nursery, and the William Walton Centre which comprises several classrooms and teaching facilities. At this point, the school began to take admit non-chorister pupils as well. The school opened a pre-preparatory department in 1984 and a nursery in 1998.

The school today
All pupils are boys, except a small number of girls in the nursery. The 14 boarders are choristers or probationary choristers for the Cathedral. The School now offers Flexi-boarding as well, at the moment they have 4 regular flexi-boarders The dormitories in which they sleep are named after distinguished former organists including Ley, Taverner, Armstrong and Harwood. All other pupils are day boys, among them eighteen choristers who sing in Worcester College Chapel. The school used to provide choristers for Exeter College but this ended when Exeter established a mixed choir. In addition to the focus on Music, there is also a distinguished tradition of Art, and the school contributes an annual exhibition to Oxford's Artweeks festival. In 2019, the school also started providing choristers for the Pembroke college choir.

Leavers typically move on to local schools such as Magdalen College School, Oxford, Abingdon School, St Edward's School, Oxford, Bloxham School and D'Overbroeck's College Leckford Place. There is also a tradition of choristers winning Music Scholarships to destinations further afield, which in recent years have included Harrow School, Uppingham School, Eton College, Sherborne School and Wellington College.

Notable headmasters
 Wilfrid Oldaker, 1938 to 1945

Notable alumni
 Simon Carrington – conductor and founding member of the a cappella group King's Singers 
 Joscelyn Godwin – musicologist
 Toby Jones – actor
 Jan Morris – author and historian
 Crispin Nash-Williams – mathematician
 Dorothy L. Sayers – novelist, was born at the school during her father's time as Headmaster
 Sir William Walton, OM – composer
 Eric Whelpton – writer and lecturer
 Roderick Williams – composer and singer

References

External links 
 
 Christ Church Cathedral Choir website
 ISI Inspection Report
 Christ Church information

1546 establishments in England
Educational institutions established in the 1540s
Boys' schools in Oxfordshire
Schools in Oxford
Boarding schools in Oxfordshire
Choir schools in England
School
Cathedral schools
Preparatory schools in Oxfordshire
Church of England private schools in the Diocese of Oxford